Abdul Fattah Al Agha (born 1 August 1984), is a retired Syrian footballer who played as a striker. He spent the majority of his career playing for Syrian side Al Ittihad Aleppo and other clubs from Egypt.

Career

Club career 
On 20 June 2010, Al Agha moved to Wadi Degla in the Egyptian Premier League and signed a 3-year contract.

International career 
Al Agha was a part of the Syrian Under-19 national team that finished in Fourth place in the 2004 AFC U-19 Championship in Malaysia. He scored one goal in Syria's 4–1 win over Laos in the second match of the group-stage.

Al Agha has been a regular for the Syria national football team since 2004. He was a part of the Syria national football team in the 2010 FIFA World Cup qualification.

In the 2009 Nehru Cup in India, Al Agha scored one goal in a 2–0 victory over Kyrgyzstan in Syria's opening match of the tournament. He scored the second goal for Syria after Mohamed Al Zeno opened the scoring. He also scored two goals in Syria's 4–0 win over Sri Lanka and finished as top scorer of the friendly tournament.

Al Agha was selected to Valeriu Tiţa's 23-man final squad for the 2011 AFC Asian Cup in Qatar. He came as a substitute in the second group game against Japan, replacing Jehad Al Hussain in the 77th minute.

International goals 
As of match played 5 June 2016. Syria score listed first, score column indicates score after each Al Agha goal.

Honour and titles

Club 
Al Ittihad Aleppo
 Syrian Premier League: 2005
 Syrian Cup: 2005, 2006

National Team 
 AFC U-19 Championship 2004: Fourth place
 Nehru Cup: 2009 Runner-up

Individual 
 Top Goalscorer Nehru Cup: 2009  (3 goals)

References

External links 
 

1984 births
Living people
Sportspeople from Aleppo
Syrian footballers
Association football forwards
Syria international footballers
Syrian expatriate footballers
Expatriate footballers in Egypt
Expatriate footballers in Iraq
Syrian expatriate sportspeople in Egypt
Syrian expatriate sportspeople in Iraq
Al-Ittihad Aleppo players
Wadi Degla SC players
FC Masr players
El Qanah FC players
El Gouna FC players
Amanat Baghdad players
2011 AFC Asian Cup players
Footballers at the 2006 Asian Games
Asian Games competitors for Syria
Syrian Premier League players
21st-century Syrian people